Rosario Advent High School is a school in  Rosario, Batangas Philippines.

References

High schools in Batangas